Mary Joy Dela Cruz Baron (born December 12, 1995), also known as Majoy Baron, is a Filipino volleyball player. She went to Concepcion Catholic School in Concepcion, Tarlac. She attended college at De La Salle University. She is currently playing for the F2 Logistics Cargo Movers playing as a middle blocker. Baron is also part of the Philippine National Women’s Volleyball Team.

Career
Baron was a member of the DLSU Lady Spikers which won the women's UAAP Volleyball Championship from year 2016 to 2018.

Baron won the UAAP Season 78 Best Blocker award in April 2016. The following year, she won the Most Valuable Player award for UAAP Season 79.

With F2 Logistics Cargo Movers, Baron won the 2017 PSL Grand Prix Conference championship and was awarded the Second Best Middle Blocker.

In 2018, Baron was a member of the Philippines women's national volleyball team where she played as a Middle Blocker.

Clubs
  Meralco Power Spikers (2015)
  F2 Logistics Cargo Movers (2016–present)

Awards

Individuals
 UAAP Season 78 "Best Blocker"
 UAAP Season 79 "Season's Most Valuable Player"
 2017 PSL All-Filipino "1st Best Middle Blocker"
 2017 Philippine Superliga Grand Prix "2nd Best Middle Blocker"
 2018 Philippine Superliga Invitational Cup "2nd Best Middle Blocker"
 2018 Philippine Superliga All-Filipino Conference "2nd Best Middle Blocker"
 2019 Philippine Superliga All-Filipino Conference "2nd Best Middle Blocker"
 2019 ASEAN Grand Prix - First Leg "Best Middle Blocker"
 2019 ASEAN Grand Prix - Second Leg "Best Middle Blocker"
 2019 Philippine Superliga Invitational Conference "1st Best Middle Blocker"
 2019 Philippine Superliga Invitational Conference "Most Valuable Player"

Collegiate
 2014 UAAP Season 76 volleyball tournaments -  Silver medal, with De La Salle Lady Spikers
 2015 UAAP Season 77 volleyball tournaments -  Silver medal, with De La Salle Lady Spikers
 2016 UAAP Season 78 volleyball tournaments -  Champion, with De La Salle Lady Spikers
 2017 UAAP Season 79 volleyball tournaments -  Champion, with De La Salle Lady Spikers
 2018 UAAP Season 80 volleyball tournaments -  Champion, with De La Salle Lady Spikers

Clubs
 2016 PSL All-Filipino Conference –  Champion, with F2 Logistics Cargo Movers
 2016 PSL Grand Prix Conference -  Bronze medal, with F2 Logistics Cargo Movers
 2017 PSL All-Filipino Conference -  Silver medal, with F2 Logistics Cargo Movers
 2017 PSL Grand Prix Conference –  Champion, with F2 Logistics Cargo Movers
 2018 PSL Grand Prix Conference -  Silver medal, with F2 Logistics Cargo Movers
 2018 PSL Invitational Cup -  Champion, with F2 Logistics Cargo Movers
 2018 PSL All-Filipino Conference -  Silver medal, with F2 Logistics Cargo Movers
2019 PSL Grand Prix Conference -  Silver medal, with F2 Logistics Cargo Movers
2019 PSL All-Filipino Conference -  Champion, with F2 Logistics Cargo Movers
 2019 PSL Invitational Conference -  Champion, with F2 Logistics Cargo Movers

Personal life
Off the court, Mary Joy Baron works as a model.

References

External links

1995 births
Filipino women's volleyball players
Living people
Sportspeople from Tarlac
De La Salle University alumni
University Athletic Association of the Philippines volleyball players
Middle blockers
Volleyball players at the 2018 Asian Games
Competitors at the 2019 Southeast Asian Games
Asian Games competitors for the Philippines
Competitors at the 2021 Southeast Asian Games
Southeast Asian Games competitors for the Philippines
21st-century Filipino women